The National Sports Training Center (NSTC) is a sport center in Zuoying District, Kaohsiung, Taiwan.

History
The sport center was originally established in November 1976 as Zuoying Training Center to train athletes that participated for the 1976 Summer Olympics in Montreal, Quebec, Canada. The original total area was 15 hectares. It has then been expanded to 22 hectares.

Organizational structures
 Athlete Education and Training Department
 Competitive Sports Department
 Finance Department
 Operation Department
 Sports Science and Research Department

Facilities
The sport center consists of archery field, baseball field, martial arts hall, multipurpose balls hall, softball field, track and field, slope and sand track, weight training room and meals and lodging building.

Transportation
The sport center is accessible within walking distance west of World Games Station of Kaohsiung MRT.

See also
 Sports in Taiwan

References

External links

 

1976 establishments in Taiwan
Sports venues completed in 2015
Sports venues in Kaohsiung
Zuoying District